May de Montravel Edwardes (1887 – 10 December 1964) was a British painter and miniaturist.

Biography
Edwardes was born in London and studied at the Cope and Nichol School of Art in South Kensington before entering the Royal Academy Schools. Edwardes was at the Royal Academy Schools from 1907 to 1912 during which time she won both bronze and silver medals for her work.

During her career she exhibited at the Royal Academy, with the Royal Institute of Oil Painters and was a member of the Royal Miniature Society. Edwardes exhibited at the Salon des Artistes Francais in Paris from 1926 and also had a solo show at the Brook Street Gallery in London. For most of her life, Edwardes lived in London.

References

1887 births
1964 deaths
20th-century English painters
20th-century English women artists
Alumni of the Royal Academy Schools
Artists from London
English women painters
Portrait miniaturists